Juan Andrés Dutra (29 October 1913 – 5 March 1976) was a Uruguayan rower. He competed in the men's coxed four at the 1936 Summer Olympics.

References

1913 births
1976 deaths
Uruguayan male rowers
Olympic rowers of Uruguay
Rowers at the 1936 Summer Olympics
Sportspeople from Montevideo